The Roman Catholic Diocese of Santa Rosa de Copán (erected 2 February 1916) is a suffragan of the Archdiocese of San Pedro Sula.

Bishops

Ordinaries
Claudio María Volio y Jímenez (1916–1926)
Angelo Maria Navarro (1928–1951)
Carlos Luis Geromini (1952–1958)
Héctor Enrique Santos Hernández, S.D.B. (1958–1962), appointed Archbishop of Tegucigalpa
José Carranza Chévez (1962–1980)
Luis Alfonso Santos Villeda, S.D.B. (1984–2011)
Darwin Rudy Andino Ramírez, C.R.S. (since 2011)

Auxiliary bishop
José de la Cruz Turcios y Barahona, S.D.B. (1943-1947), appointed Archbishop of Tegucigalpa

External links and references

Santa Rosa de Copan
Santa Rosa de Copan
Santa Rosa de Copan
Roman Catholic Ecclesiastical Province of Tegucigalpa